Ameen Al-Dakhil (born 6 March 2002) is a professional footballer who plays as a centre-back for  club Burnley. Born in Iraq, he represents Belgium internationally.

Early life
Al-Dakhil was born in Iraq, and moved to Belgium with his family at the age of 5, as a refugee during the Iraq War. He began playing football with the youth academies of Kortenaken, Hoegaarden-Outgaarden, Tienen, Anderlecht and Standard Liège. Originally a striker, Al-Dakhil was then converted to a centre-back.

Professional career
Al-Dakhil made his professional debut for Standard Liège on 23 July 2021, in a 1–1 Belgian First Division A tie with Genk.

On 31 January 2022, Al-Dakhil moved to fellow Belgian side Sint-Truiden on a permanent deal.

On 13 January 2023, Al-Dakhil joined EFL Championship side Burnley for an undisclosed fee, signing a three-and-a-half-year contract with the club.

International career
Born in Iraq, Al-Dakhil was raised in Belgium and holds a Belgian citizenship. He has been a youth international for Belgium, having represented the under-17, under-18 and under-21 national teams.

In October 2020, he was called-up to represent the Iraqi squad at the AFC U-19 Championship, but the tournament was eventually cancelled due to the COVID-19 pandemic.

Career statistics

References

External links
 
 ACFF Profile

2002 births
Living people
Sportspeople from Baghdad
Belgian footballers
Belgium youth international footballers
Iraqi footballers
Belgian people of Iraqi descent
Iraqi emigrants to Belgium
Standard Liège players
Sint-Truidense V.V. players
Belgian Pro League players
Association football defenders
Burnley F.C. players
Belgian expatriate footballers
Belgian expatriate sportspeople in England
English Football League players